Robert Edward Whitlow (February 15, 1936 – October 23, 2020) was an American professional football player who was a center in the National Football League (NFL) for the Washington Redskins, Detroit Lions, Atlanta Falcons, and Cleveland Browns.  He played college football for the Arizona Wildcats.

Early life
Whitlow was born in Shelbyville, Indiana and attended Bloomington High School in Bloomington, Indiana, where he played high school football and participated in track and field as a shot putter.

College and military career
After high school, Whitlow attended and played college football at Compton Junior College in Compton, California, before transferring to the University of Arizona.  He was also a shot putter in college.  He left college in 1957 and enlisted in the United States Marine Corps.

Professional career
After serving with the Marines, Whitlow qualified for the Summer Olympics trials in shot put, but decided to play football instead.  He signed with the Chicago Bears in 1960, but was then traded to the Washington Redskins.  Midway through the 1961 season, he was traded to the Detroit Lions, where he played through 1965 and played every offensive down in 1962 and 1963.  Whitlow was then traded to the Atlanta Falcons during their inaugural 1966 season.  He was then traded to the Los Angeles Rams for undisclosed draft picks, but never played for the Rams.  In 1968, he was signed by the Pittsburgh Steelers, but was waived before the end of the offseason.  He was then signed by the Cleveland Browns and played for them for one season, but then had to retire after a hernia operation.

During the Detroit Lions 1963 season, Whitlow was the center for George Plimpton when Plimpton was practicing and playing with the Lions for the Sports Illustrated article that became the book "Paper Lion".

Racing career
Whitlow is the only NFL player to also compete in USAC and NASCAR stockcar events.

Coaching career
Whitlow was an assistant basketball coach for two seasons at Oakland Community College from 1986-1988. Whitlow was the head basketball coach at Madonna College from 1988 to 1989, posting a 13–17 record. He was a track and field coach at Northview High School in Johns Creek, Georgia.

He died on October 23, 2020, in Forsyth County, Georgia at age 84.

References

External links
 

1936 births
2020 deaths
American football offensive linemen
Arizona Wildcats football players
Atlanta Falcons players
Cleveland Browns players
Detroit Lions players
Military personnel from Indiana
People from Shelbyville, Indiana
Players of American football from Indiana
Washington Redskins players